Australia sent a delegation to compete at the 1952 Winter Olympics from the 14 to 25 February 1952 in Oslo, Norway. This was the nation's second appearance at the Winter Olympic Games with their last appearance being in 1936.

Australia delegation consisted of nine competitors in four sports. This included the nation's debut in alpine skiing, cross-country skiing, and figure skating to go along with their appearance in the speed skating. Australia best result from the 1952 Games was a tenth-place finish in the men's singles figure skating. Nancy Hallam and Gweneth Molony became the Australia's first women athletes at the Winter Olympics as they competed in the ladies' singles figure skating, they finished 14th and 21st respectively.

Background
The Australian Olympic Committee was formed on 1 January 1895 with the nation making their debut at the first Olympics in Athens with Teddy Flack being the first representative of the nation. This was the nation's second appearance at an Winter Olympics and the first since 1936. It was also the 13th overall Olympics that Australia had sent a delegation in. The 1952 Winter Olympics was held at Oslo in Norway and took place from the 14 to 25 February: a total of 694 athletes competed from 30 nations. The Australian delegation consist of nine athletes, three in the figure skating and alpine skiing, two in the Cross-country skiing and one in the speedskating.

Alpine skiing

Australia entered three skiers in the Alpine skiing events with Bob Arnott, Barry Patten competing in their only Olympics while Bill Day competing in his first of three Olympics.

Cross-country skiing

Australia entered two athletes in the cross-country skiing at the 1952 Olympics with Bruce Haslingden and Cedric Sloane being selected for the nation in what was their only appearance at an Olympics. After paying for their own expenses to the games, Haslingden and Sloane competed in two events during the 1952 games.

The first event for the duo was the men's 18 kilometres which was held on 18 February. After being held under excellent snow conditions, Haslingden would finish one place higher than Sloane as they finished in 74th and 75th repressively with Hallgeir Brenden from Norway taking the gold medal in the event. Two days later, the duo competed in the men's 50 kilometres where they wouldn't finish the event as they retired after falling 12 kilometres behind the leaders. Veikko Hakulinen from Finland claimed the gold medal with a time of 3 hours and 33 minutes.

Figure skating

Australia entered three figure skaters in the 1952 Games with Adrian Swan, Nancy Burley and Gweneth Molony representing the nation. In the men's singles, Swan who competed in first and only Olympics was initially refused to be entered by the Victorian Skating Association but was later reversed by the International Skating Union justified his spot at the games. After completing the compulsory figures in twelfth place, Swan would go on to finish in tenth place with a score of 1,248.2 with Dick Button from the United States taking out the gold medal.

In the ladies' singles, Burley and Molony who both would compete in their only Olympic games was selected on the 14 October 1951 as part of the announcement that happened with the skiing reveal. Heading into the Olympics, Molony was the two time defending national ladies' singles champion who had won at the Glaciarium. At the event which was held on the 16–17 February (compulsory figures) and 20 February (free skating), Burley would go on to finish the higher of the two Australian ladies finishing in 14th with 1220.7 points. Molony would finish seven spots behind to finish in 21st with 1119.1 points as the gold medal was won by Jeannette Altwegg from Great Britain.

Speed skating

In the first of three Olympic appearances, Colin Hickey was the only speed-skater to compete for Australia at the 1952 Games. He competed in three speed skating events with those being the 500m, 1500m and the 5000m. His first event of the games was the men's 500 metres which took place on the 16 February. From a field of 42 competitors, Hickey finished 29th with a time of 46.2 seconds, three seconds behind the gold medallist in Ken Henry from the United States. The following day, he competed in the men's 1500 metres where he came in 30th position out of 39 with a time of 2:30.4, ten seconds behind the gold medallist in Hjalmar Andersen from Norway. His final event of the Olympics was the men's 5000 metres where he finished 28th out of 35 skaters with a time of eight minutes and 57 seconds. He was forty seconds behind Anderson who claimed the gold.

See also
Australia at the Winter Olympics

References

External links 
Australia NOC
Olympic Winter Institute of Australia
"Australians at the Olympics: A definitive history" by Gary Lester 
"The Compendium: Official Australian Olympic Statistics 1896-2002" Australian Olympic Committee 

Nations at the 1952 Winter Olympics
1952
Olympics
Winter sports in Australia